Polycarpon is a genus of flowering plants in the family Caryophyllaceae. They are known generally as manyseeds. There are roughly 9 to 15 species, representing most continents. The best-known species is perhaps Polycarpon tetraphyllum, which is native to southern Europe but is present in many other regions as an introduced species. These plants are low, matted annuals spreading slender stems along the ground or erect with many branches.

Selected species
Polycarpon depressum - California manyseed
Polycarpon polycarpoides
Polycarpon prostratum
Polycarpon succulentum
Polycarpon tetraphyllum - fourleaf manyseed

References

External links
Jepson Manual Treatment
USDA Plants Profile: North American Species

Caryophyllaceae
Caryophyllaceae genera